St. Margaret's Episcopal Church may refer to:

 St. Margaret's Episcopal Church (Annapolis, Maryland)
 St. Margaret's Episcopal Church and Cemetery, Hibernia, Florida
 St. Margaret's Episcopal Church (Palm Desert, California)
 St. Margaret's Episcopal Church (Woodbridge, VA)
 St. Margaret of Antioch Episcopal Church (Staatsburg, New York)

See also
 St. Margaret's Church (disambiguation)